Dromara Village Football Club is a Northern Irish intermediate football club based in Dromara who currently play in Division 1A of the Northern Amateur Football League. The club has three senior teams playing in the Amateur League and the Newcastle and District League, and one under-17 youth team competing in the Lisburn Invitational League.
The club joined the Newcastle and District League in 1976, and gained intermediate status upon entry to Division 1C of the Amateur League in 1986. The biggest achievement for the club in recent years was promotion to the Premier Division of the Amateur Premier League at the end of the 2007–08 season. In latter history one of the big highlights for the club was reaching the Steel & Sons cup final in 1996 when the Villagers were narrowly defeated in a cup final replay, having drawn the first tie against Ballymena United Reserves. They play their football at Bell's Bridge, just outside Dromara, and boosts some of the best facilities in the Amateur League, consisting of two well kept full size playing pitches, one full size training pitch, a club house and a small grandstand for spectators.

Honours

Intermediate honours
Border Cup: 1
2010–11

Notes

External links
 Dromara Village Official Club website
 nifootball.co.uk - (For fixtures, results and tables of all Northern Ireland amateur football leagues)

 

Association football clubs in Northern Ireland
Northern Amateur Football League clubs
Association football clubs in County Down
1976 establishments in Northern Ireland